Moss Brook is a watercourse in Rochdale, Greater Manchester and a tributary of the River Roch. It originates in Newbold, and flows Northwards to join the River Roch. The majority of the brook is now culverted.

Rivers of the Metropolitan Borough of Rochdale
1